The East-West Highway, also referred to as the A1 Highway, is a motorway construction project in Algeria, with most construction completed by 2015. The project of a six-lane highway across Algeria was launched in 2007, and is claimed to be one of the largest public works projects in the world.

The US$11 billion project is being undertaken by a complex consortium of international suppliers, and there have been concerns about corruption, waste, and delays. The Central and Western sections of the road were built by a consortium of China Railway Construction Corporation and CITIC while the Eastern section was constructed by a Japanese consortium of Kajima Corporation, Nishimatsu Construction Company, Itochu Corporation, Hazama Corporation and Taisei Corporation.

Route

When completed, the highway will run  from the Moroccan border to the Tunisian border, connecting Algeria's major coastal cities. Other hub roads are under construction as well, thus providing a link to other important cities of the inner part of the country.
The East-West highway was the first stage of Algeria's five-year plan, which included spending US$40.9 billion on modernization of road networks and increasing ports' capacity.

References

External links
 THE ALGERIA EAST-WEST HIGHWAY: AN INTERIM REPORT

Highways in Algeria
Transport in Algeria